Liv Hovde defeated Luca Udvardy in the final, 6–3, 6–4 to win the girls' singles tennis title at the 2022 Wimbledon Championships.

Ane Mintegi del Olmo was the reigning champion, but was no longer eligible to participate in junior events.

Seeds

Draw

Finals

Top half

Section 1

Section 2

Bottom half

Section 3

Section 4

Qualifying

Seeds

Qualifiers

Lucky losers

Draw

First qualifier

Second qualifier

Third qualifier

Fourth qualifier

Fifth qualifier

Sixth qualifier

Seventh qualifier

Eighth qualifier

References

External links

Draws

Girls' Singles
Wimbledon Championship by year – Girls' singles